The South American University Athletics Championships was an international athletics competition for student athletes from South American countries. It was staged on one occasion in May 2005 at the Estadio Modelo Alberto Spencer Herrera in Guayaquil, Ecuador. Four nations competed: Chile, Colombia, Ecuador and Peru. A total of 42 athletics events were contested, 22 by men and 20 by women. Women did not compete in the pole vault, 3000 metres steeplechase or half marathon, while the men did not compete in a combined track and field event. The host nation topped the medal table, winning 22 events and a total of 55 medals. Peru were runners-up with eleven gold medals, while Chile and Colombia finished with six and three gold medals, respectively.

Ecuador's Lucy Jaramillo was the most successful athlete of the competition, winning the women's 400 metres, 800 metres and 400 metres hurdles titles. Her compatriots  Silvia Paredes  (5000 metres, 10,000 metres) and  Luis Morán (100 metres, 200 metres) won double gold. Peru's Roxana Mendoza claimed the short sprint double on the women's side. Colombia's Kelly López won a medal in all of the women's sprint events, bar the 4 × 400 metres relay (in which Colombia did not compete).

Results

Men

Women

Medal table

References

South American University Championships. GBR Athletics. Retrieved 2019-10-10.

2005 in athletics (track and field)
2005 in Ecuadorian sport
2005 in South American sport
May 2005 sports events in South America
Student sports competitions
Athletics competitions in South America
Sports competitions in Guayaquil
Defunct athletics competitions
International athletics competitions